The Provincial Council of North Holland, also known as the States of North Holland, is the provincial council of North Holland, Netherlands. It forms the legislative body of the province. Its 55 seats are distributed every four years in provincial elections.

Current composition
Since the 2019 provincial elections, the distribution of seats of the Provincial Council of North Holland has been as follows:

See also
 States of Holland and West Friesland
 Provincial politics in the Netherlands

References

External links
  

Politics of North Holland
North Holland